Robredo is a surname. Notable people with the surname include:

Álvaro Robredo (born 1993), Spanish cyclist
Jesse Robredo (1958–2012), Filipino politician
Leni Robredo (born 1965), Filipina lawyer and social activist
Tommy Robredo (born 1982), Spanish tennis player

See also
Robledo (name)